Play Dead may refer to:

Film and television 
Play Dead (1981 film), a 1981 horror film
Play Dead (2009 film), a 2009 black comedy film
Play Dead (show), a 2010 Off-Broadway entertainment directed by Teller

Literature
Play Dead (novel), a 1990 novel by Harlan Coben
 Play Dead, a 2013 novel by Bill James (novelist) 
 Play Dead, a 2008 novel by Richard Montanari
 Play Dead, a 2016 novel by Angela Marsons

Music
Play Dead (band), an English gothic rock group
"Play Dead" (song), by Björk
"Play Dead", song by HIM from the album Dark Light, 2005
Play Dead (Astrid album), 2001
Play Dead (Amanda Richards album), 2012
Play Dead (Mutemath album), 2017

Other uses
Playdead, video game development company

See also
Playing dead (disambiguation)